Thomas McCulloch (25 December 1921 – 2 October 2001) was a Scottish professional footballer who played as a winger.

Career
Born in Glasgow, McCulloch made 204 appearances in the League systems of Scotland and England for Airdrie, Queen of the South, Northampton Town, Bradford City and Crewe Alexandra between 1946 and 1955, scoring 24 goals.

He also played non-League football for March Town United.

References

External links

1921 births
2001 deaths
Scottish footballers
Airdrieonians F.C. (1878) players
Queen of the South F.C. players
Northampton Town F.C. players
Bradford City A.F.C. players
Crewe Alexandra F.C. players
Scottish Football League players
English Football League players
March Town United F.C. players
Association football wingers